is a Japanese former Nippon Professional Baseball catcher/infielder/outfielder.

References 

1973 births
Living people
Baseball people from Tokyo Metropolis 
Keio University alumni
Japanese baseball players
Nippon Professional Baseball catchers
Nippon Professional Baseball infielders
Nippon Professional Baseball outfielders
Seibu Lions players
Asian Games medalists in baseball
Baseball players at the 1994 Asian Games
Asian Games gold medalists for Japan
Medalists at the 1994 Asian Games